Valentin Sabella (born July 5, 1999) is an Argentine footballer who plays as a forward for USL League One side Northern Colorado Hailstorm.

Career
After impressing for semi-professional United Premier Soccer League side Florida Soccer Soldiers in the 2019 Lamar Hunt US Open Cup, Sabella signed for USL Championship side Charlotte Independence, one of the sides he helped eliminate from the competition.

On 18 March 2022, it was announced Sabella had signed with MLS Next Pro side Tacoma Defiance.

On 25 January 2023, Sabella joined USL League One side Northern Colorado Hailstorm FC.

References

External links
 

1999 births
Living people
American soccer players
Association football forwards
Charlotte Independence players
Soccer players from Florida
USL Championship players
United Premier Soccer League players
Cancún F.C. footballers
Tacoma Defiance players
MLS Next Pro players
Northern Colorado Hailstorm FC players